Watthana Nakhon railway station is a railway station located in Watthana Nakhon Subdistrict, Watthana Nakhon District, Sa Kaeo Province.

References 

Railway stations in Thailand
Sa Kaeo province